Abingdon Bank is a historic bank building with a residence located at Abingdon, Washington County, Virginia. It was built about 1845, and is a two-story Greek Revival / Late Victorian style brick building.  It originally housed the residence of the cashier and his family in one part, and the bank, counting room, and vault were in the other.

It was listed on the National Register of Historic Places in 1969 and is located within the Abingdon Historic District.

References

Bank buildings on the National Register of Historic Places in Virginia
Greek Revival houses in Virginia
Commercial buildings completed in 1845
Buildings and structures in Washington County, Virginia
National Register of Historic Places in Washington County, Virginia
Individually listed contributing properties to historic districts on the National Register in Virginia